William E. Naff (1929–2005) was an American scholar of Japanese language and literature.

He was born on February 14, 1929, in Wenatchee, Washington State, and served with the US Air Force from 1946-1949. He received a BA degree, magna cum laude, from the University of Washington, and subsequently earned an MA in Japanese history and a Ph.D. in Japanese literature from the same university.

In 1969 he became founding chairman of the department of Asian Languages and Literature at the University of Massachusetts Amherst. In addition to teaching Japanese language and literature, he taught Japanese culture, scientific Japanese, science fiction and sometimes Chinese literature.

His translation of Shimazaki Toson's Before the Dawn (Yo-ake Mae) received the 1987 Friendship Commission Prize for the Translation of Japanese Literature. He also completed a biography of Shimazaki Toson, The Kiso Road: The Life and Times of Shimazaki Toson. His translation of the 8-volume historical novel by Shiba Ryotaro, Clouds Over the Hills (Saka no Ue no Kumo), which tells the story of Japan from the Meiji Restoration to the Russo-Japanese War and Japan's emergence on the world stage, was uncompleted at his death.

References

1929 births
2005 deaths
Japanese literature academics
Japanese–English translators
People from Wenatchee, Washington
University of Massachusetts Amherst faculty
20th-century translators